Cedar Hill is a historic home located on  at Barstow, Calvert County, Maryland, United States. It is one of the few remaining cruciform dwelling houses existing in Maryland, built in the 18th century that is typical of 17th-century architecture. It is a -story house with a 2-story porch tower, built of brick laid in Flemish bond. It is now operated as a bed and breakfast, meeting hall, and retreat center.

Cedar Hill was listed on the National Register of Historic Places in 1973.

References

External links
, including photo from 1996, at Maryland Historical Trust
Cedar Hill Country Estate website

Houses on the National Register of Historic Places in Maryland
Houses in Calvert County, Maryland
Historic American Buildings Survey in Maryland
Bed and breakfasts in Maryland
National Register of Historic Places in Calvert County, Maryland